Josué Duverger (born April 27, 2000) is a professional footballer who plays as a goalkeeper for Portuguese club Vitória Setúbal and the Haiti national team.

International career
Born in Montreal, Quebec, Canada, Duverguer is of Haitian descent. He was called up for an evaluation for the Canada men's national under-17 soccer team in October 2016. He was called up to the Haiti national under-20 football team for the 2017 CONCACAF U-20 Championship at the age of sixteen, appearing for all three of the teams' appearances in the tournament. He was also called up to the Haiti national under-17 football team for the 2017 CONCACAF U-17 Championship, but didn't make any appearances for the team in the tournament.

Duverguer made his debut for the senior Haiti national team in a 1–0 friendly win over the United Arab Emirates on 10 November 2017, at the age of seventeen. Against Canada in a CONCACAF World Cup qualifying game he mis-controlled a back pass and made two mis-kick attempts at a clearance as the ball rolled into the net for an own goal. The clip of the own goal went viral with some calling it one of the worst own goals ever seen.

References

External links
 
 Sport.de Profile
 Fora de Jogo Profile
 NFT Profile

2000 births
Living people
Soccer players from Montreal
Citizens of Haiti through descent
Haitian footballers
Haiti international footballers
Haiti under-20 international footballers
Haitian Quebecers
Black Canadian soccer players
2019 CONCACAF Gold Cup players
2021 CONCACAF Gold Cup players
Canadian soccer players
Canadian sportspeople of Haitian descent
Vitória F.C. players
Campeonato de Portugal (league) players
Canadian expatriate soccer players
Haitian expatriate footballers
Expatriate footballers in Portugal
Canadian expatriate sportspeople in Portugal
Haitian expatriate sportspeople in Portugal
Association football goalkeepers